Khadzhimurad Gadzhiyev (born 12 October 2000) is an Azerbaijani freestyle wrestler. He won one of the bronze medals in the men's 74 kg event at the 2019 European Games held in Minsk, Belarus.

In March 2021, he qualified at the European Qualification Tournament to compete at the 2020 Summer Olympics in Tokyo, Japan. In June 2021, he won one of the bronze medals in the men's 74 kg event at the 2021 Waclaw Ziolkowski Memorial held in Warsaw, Poland.

He was not able to compete at the 2020 Summer Olympics due to injury and, instead, Turan Bayramov represented Azerbaijan in the men's 74 kg event.

In 2022, he won one of the bronze medals in his event at the Matteo Pellicone Ranking Series 2022 held in Rome, Italy.

References

External links 
 

Living people
Azerbaijani male sport wrestlers
Wrestlers at the 2019 European Games
European Games bronze medalists for Azerbaijan
European Games medalists in wrestling
2000 births
21st-century Azerbaijani people